The Sioux Empire Conference was a high school athletic conference formed by schools in northwest Iowa and southeast South Dakota.

History
The Sioux Empire Conference was established on October 20, 1964, with Central Lyon Community School District, Sioux Center Community Schools, and West Sioux Community School District of Iowa as founding members, alongside Canton Public Schools and Vermillion Public Schools of South Dakota. Central Lyon and West Sioux left the Siouxland Conference to establish the Sioux Empire Conference, while Canton, Sioux Center, Vermillion were independent schools. Athletic competitions began in 1965, with track and field and baseball. Sports added in the 1965–66 school year included football and basketball. By 1967, the Sioux Empire Conference had disbanded. Sioux Center and Central Lyon returned to the Siouxland Conference, and West Sioux became an independent.

References

1967 disestablishments in Iowa
1967 disestablishments in South Dakota
Defunct sports leagues in the United States
1964 establishments in South Dakota
1964 establishments in Iowa
High school sports in Iowa
High school sports conferences and leagues in the United States
Sports leagues established in 1964
Sports leagues disestablished in 1967